Allianssi Vantaa is a football club based in the city of Vantaa, Finland. It is not the same club as the former Finnish football club, AC Allianssi.

Allianssi Vantaa was founded in 2006 and they currently play in the third division of Finnish football, Kolmonen. The club has a total of almost 3000 youth players at Korson Palloseura, Koivukylän Palloseura and Tikkurilan Palloseura, which are clubs that are loosely affiliated with Allianssi. Kaj Wiander is the chairman of the club.

The club's current homeground is Tikkurilan urheilupuisto in Tikkurila.

Season to season

2013 season

Allianssi are competing in Section 2 (Lohko 2) of the Kolmonen administered by the Helsinki SPL and Uusimaa SPL.  This is the fourth highest tier in the Finnish football system.  In 2012 Allianssi finished first in Nelonen (Section 2) and gained promotion back to Kolmonen after being relegated 2011.

Allianssi Vantaa T98 girls

Allianssi Vantaa T98 was a girls' football (soccer) team, founded in October 2011
from the players born between 1998 and 1999 of Korson Palloseura and Koivukylän Palloseura
football clubs. The team broke up in late 2014, after 3 years of playing together.

The joint team was established to allow the girls from both clubs to continue playing in matches
after the teams lost their coaches, and a number of players moved to other football clubs.

References

Sources
Official Website 
 Allianssi Vantaa Facebook
Allianssi Vantaa T98 girls 
Allianssi Vantaa T98 

Football clubs in Finland
Association football clubs established in 2006
Sport in Vantaa
2006 establishments in Finland